Safsaf  ( Safṣaf) is a town in the District of Jabal al Akhdar in north-eastern Libya. It is located about 16 km east of Bayda.

References

External links
Satellite map at Maplandia.com

Populated places in Jabal al Akhdar